The 1908 Federal Hockey League (FHL) season was the fifth season of the league.  After the death of Bud McCourt, and the resignations of teams from the league, the league had only three teams. The Ottawa Victorias and Cornwall Hockey Club returned from the previous year's teams. The league, previously amateur, was now composed of only professional teams, and billed itself as the 'Federal League.' The Renfrew Creamery Kings of the Upper Ottawa Valley Hockey League would play in the league with home games in Brockville, Ontario, playing as the Brockville team. This situation eventually caused the league to cease operations. Renfrew would return to the FAHL the following season, playing in Renfrew.

Season
The season would not last a month. The league suspended play on January 22, 1908. Brockville, which employed the Renfrew team to play, notified the Cornwall club that they would not play a game on January 23. The reason given was the refusal of the Ottawa Victorias to play against Renfrew wearing Brockville jerseys. The Renfrew club would continue in the Upper Ottawa Valley League, until it folded as well, then play exhibitions to finish the hockey season.

Results

‡ Victorias refused to play Brockville team composed of Renfrew players.

Stanley Cup challenge

During the season, as champions in 1907, the Victorias challenged the Stanley Cup champion Montreal Wanderers. The Victorias were no match for the Wanderers, losing two straight games in poor fashion.

Wanderers vs. Ottawa
The Wanderers would win 9–3, 13–1 (22–4).

See also
 Federal Amateur Hockey League
 List of pre-NHL seasons
 List of ice hockey leagues

References

Federal Amateur Hockey League seasons
FAHL